Julie E. Adams (born February 24, 1977) is an American government official and former political advisor who served as the 33rd Secretary of the United States Senate from 2015 to 2021.

Early life and education 
Adams is a native of Iowa City, Iowa. She received a Bachelor of Arts degree in political science from Luther College in 1999 and a Master of Arts in education from the University of Iowa in 2002. As an undergraduate, Adams participated a Luther College semester-long internship program in Washington, D.C., during which she interned with the Children's Defense Fund.

Career 

After graduating from college, Adams took a break from working toward obtaining a teaching certificate to help run Iowa Rep. James Leach's congressional campaign.

Following Leach's re-election, Adams went to Washington, D.C., where she served for 17 months as an aide to First Lady Laura Bush, before joining the staff of then-Senate Majority Whip, Mitch McConnell, as deputy communications director in 2003.

From September 2007 to January 2009, Adams worked in the East Wing of the White House Office as a spokesperson for First Lady Laura Bush. Adams then served six years as director of administration and member relations for then-Senate Minority Leader McConnell. 

Adams began her term as the 33rd Secretary of the Senate on January 6, 2015, during the 114th Congress. She is the seventh woman to hold the position.

She left the position on March 1, 2021.

References

Living people
1977 births
Luther College (Iowa) alumni
People from Iowa City, Iowa
Secretaries of the United States Senate
Iowa Republicans
University of Iowa alumni
George W. Bush administration personnel